Imilce or Himilce was the Spanish wife of Hannibal Barca according to a number of historical sources.

History
Livy records that Hannibal married a woman from Castulo, a powerful Spanish city allied with Carthage. The Roman poet Silius Italicus identifies this woman as Imilce. Silius suggests a Greek origin for Imilce, but Gilbert Charles-Picard argued for a Punic heritage based on an etymology from the Semitic root m-l-k ('chief, the 'king'). Silius also suggests the existence of a son, who is otherwise not attested by Livy, Polybius, or Appian. The son is thought to have been named Haspar or Aspar. According to Silius, during the Punic wars Hannibal tearfully sent Imilce and their son back to Carthage for their safety. Some historians have questioned the historicity of this event and suggested that it is an imitation of Pompey sending his wife away to Lucca for her safety during military conflict.

Cultural depictions 
Imicle is honored in Baeza, Andalusia with a statue as part of the Fuente de Los Leones (meaning Fountain of the Lions).

See also 
 List of the Pre-Roman peoples of the Iberian Peninsula
 Carthaginian Iberia

References 

Hannibal
3rd-century BC women
2nd-century BC women
2nd-century BC Punic people
Carthaginian women
Pre-Roman peoples of the Iberian Peninsula